Phragmidium rubi-idaei is a plant pathogen infecting caneberries, Rubus spp.

References

External links

Fungal plant pathogens and diseases
Small fruit diseases
Pucciniales
Taxa named by Augustin Pyramus de Candolle
Fungi described in 1815